Olga Lossky (also Olga Andreyevna Losskaya, ; born 5 December 1980, in Paris) is a contemporary French writer of Russian origin.

Olga Lossky is the great-granddaughter of Vladimir Lossky, himself the son of Nikolay Lossky.

Works 
2004: Requiem pour un clou, Paris, Éditions Gallimard, Collection Blanche, 184 p. 
 - Prix Fénéon de Littérature 2004
2007: Vers le jour sans déclin. Une vie d’ (1907-2005), Paris, Éditions du Cerf, series "L’Histoire à vif", 453 p. 
2010: La Révolution des cierges, Éditions Gallimard, Collection Blanche, 354 p. 
 - Prix du Roman Historique des Rendez-Vous de l'Histoire - Coup de Cœur des Lecteurs 2010
 - Prix Augiéras 2011
2013: La Maison Zeidawi, Paris, Éditions Denoël, series "Romans français", 237 p. .
 - Prix France-Liban 2014
2016: Le Revers de la médaille, Éditions Denoël, series "Romans français", 304 p.

References

External links 

 Olga Lossky - La maison Zeidawi on YouTube

21st-century French novelists
Prix Fénéon winners
Writers from Paris
1981 births
Living people
21st-century French women writers